Seleucia at the Zeugma (transliterated Seleukeia epi tou Zeugmatos) was a Hellenistic fortified town in the present Republic of Turkey on the left (south) bank of the Euphrates, across from ancient Samosata and not far from it. 

It is mentioned in isolated incidents:  Antiochus III the Great married a Pontic princess there in 221 BC; the Oxford Classical Dictionary ascribed this to Zeugma. Tigranes let Cleopatra Selene, the widow of Antiochus X Eusebes, be killed there. Pompey gave the city and its surroundings to Antiochus I Theos of Commagene; Pliny the Elder nonetheless ascribes it to Coele Syria. The bishop Eusebius of Samosata ruled a day's journey from his see, even to Zeugma. The name of the city is confirmed by an inscription from Rhodes, which refers to a man "of Seleucia, of those on the Euphrates".   

The location of Seleucia at the Zeugma is uncertain. It had a bridge of boats, like the well-known (and now  submerged) city of Zeugma, in Osrohene further downstream; which is too far downstream, and on the wrong side of the river to be the boundary of Eusebius' see. By the same reasoning, it cannot be either of the places called el Qantara ("bridge") which were just above, and 2 km below, modern Samsat, Turkey, before its old site was also flooded, by the Atatürk Reservoir.

The reasoning here is unclear.

See also
Zeugma, Commagene
Zeugma Mosaic Museum

References
 Pauly-Wissowa,  Realencyclopädie der classischen Altertumswissenschaft: neue Bearbeitung "Seleukia" 4, Vol 2.1 of 24, p. 1205, 1921.
 Richard Talbert, Barrington Atlas of the Greek and Roman World,, Map 67 and commentary.

Further reading
From Pauly-Wissowa
Polybius, 5.43.1
Strabo, XVI 749
Appian, Mithradates 114
Pliny the Elder, 5,82
Theodoret 4.14
CIG II 2548

Ancient Greek archaeological sites in Turkey
Seleucid colonies in Anatolia
Populated places in Osroene
Former populated places in Turkey
Lost ancient cities and towns